Tõnis Kasemets (born March 17, 1974 in Pärnu, Estonia)  is an Estonian racing driver and a former competitor in the CART Champ Car World Series. He won the 2022 IMSA Prototype Challenge championship.

Career
Kasemets emigrated to the United States in 1995 and began SCCA racing. He advanced through the open wheel ranks and by 2004 was in the Toyota Atlantic series. In 2005 he placed second in the series championship to Charles Zwolsman. He participated in a partial 2006 schedule in the Champ Car World Series for Paul Gentilozzi's Rocketsports Racing.

To participate in Champ Car in 2006 he had to gather funds for a quarter of the participation costs. Kasemets wanted to do a full season of Champ Car in 2007 and in the future he wants to own a successful team à la Newman-Haas and Forsythe. However, he has not appeared in a Champ Car or IndyCar Series race since 2006. He continued racing in the Atlantic Championship until its closure after the 2009 season and made his Firestone Indy Lights debut on the Streets of Long Beach in April 2010.

Kasemets has competed in some Grand Am Road Racing events, including the 2013 Rolex 24 Hours of Daytona.

He currently lives in Mundelein, Illinois with his son and daughter.

Racing record

SCCA National Championship Runoffs

American open–wheel racing results
(key)

Atlantic Championship

Indy Lights

Champ Car

IMSA Prototype Challenge

References

External links

Living people
1974 births
Sportspeople from Pärnu
People from Lake County, Illinois
Estonian emigrants to the United States
Estonian racing drivers
24 Hours of Daytona drivers
Champ Car drivers
Indy Lights drivers
Atlantic Championship drivers
Rolex Sports Car Series drivers
EFDA Nations Cup drivers
WeatherTech SportsCar Championship drivers
SCCA National Championship Runoffs winners
U.S. F2000 National Championship drivers
Newman Wachs Racing drivers
Team Moore Racing drivers
Rocketsports Racing drivers